Jeremy Wade McKinnon (born December 17, 1985) is an American singer, songwriter, and record producer, best known as a founding member and the lead vocalist of A Day to Remember.  He has produced full-length albums for The Ghost Inside, Neck Deep, and Wage War.

Biography
Jeremy McKinnon was raised in Ocala, Florida and grew up with two sisters. His parents are originally from Brooklyn, New York and he is of Irish and Italian descent. McKinnon first got a job at Boston Market and later went on to do construction work. McKinnon's interest in music came as a result of hanging out with a friend's band. McKinnon was inspired to write and play heavy music by a local band, Seventh Star. McKinnon often got into trouble during high school in Ocala, Florida and as a result he would write music. McKinnon's first band was the ska band All for Nothing, before joining guitarist Tom Denney and drummer Bobby Scruggs to form A Day to Remember.

He appeared in the show Pawn Stars.

McKinnon and A Day to Remember bassist Joshua Woodard have formed their own record label, Running Man; in partnership with Epitaph, they signed up band Veara.

During an interview in 2012, McKinnon said that the possibility of doing a solo album was unlikely.

On December 25, 2016, McKinnon married his long-time girlfriend, Stephanie Morrison. On Father's Day 2017, Stephanie revealed on Instagram that the two were expecting their first child together. On December 5, 2017, McKinnon and his wife announced the arrival of their first child, a daughter.

Influences
McKinnon cites punk rock band Millencolin as his biggest musical influence, and cites ska punk band Less Than Jake for his influences on the stage: "They were having fun during the concert, they were not super serious. But they were not so goofy so as to appear ridiculous. Simply, they created a great atmosphere, and I've always loved this. Then I saw the Flaming Lips, and Rammstein in Germany, and that was the craziest concert I've ever seen. I'm just trying to combine and put into practice all the amazing things that I've loved over the years."

Discography
With All for Nothing
 How to Score in High School (2002)<ref> In the Search for box enter How to Score in High School, select Title then click Begin Search.</ref>

With A Day to Remember

 And Their Name Was Treason (2005)
 For Those Who Have Heart (2007)
 Homesick (2009)
 What Separates Me from You (2010)
 Common Courtesy (2013)
 Bad Vibrations (2016)
 You're Welcome'' (2021)

Guest appearances

Production discography

References
Footnotes

Citations

 
1985 births
Living people
American male singers
American rock singers
American people of Irish descent
American people of Italian descent
Musicians from Ocala, Florida
A Day to Remember
Musicians from Gainesville, Florida
21st-century American singers
Indianola Records artists
Victory Records artists
Epitaph Records artists
Fueled by Ramen artists